Mordellistena lampros is a beetle in the genus Mordellistena of the family Mordellidae. It was described in 1962 by Franciscolo.

References

lampros
Beetles described in 1962